Grace Jane Wallace, Lady Wallace, née Stein (1804-1878) was a Scottish author.

Life
She was the eldest daughter of John Stein of Edinburgh. She became, on 19 August 1824, the second wife of Sir Alexander Don, 6th Baronet of Newton Don, and the intimate friend of Sir Walter Scott. She had two children: Sir William Henry Don, 7th Baronet, the actor; and Alexina Harriet, who married Sir Frederick Acclom Milbank, bart., of Hart and Hartlepool.

In his Familiar Letters (ii.348) Sir Walter Scott writes to his son in 1825: "Mama and Anne are quite well; they are with me on a visit to Sir Alex. Don and his new lady, who is a very pleasant woman, and plays on the harp delightfully".

Sir Alexander died in 1826; and in 1836 his widow married Sir James Maxwell Wallace (1785–1867). Lady Wallace died on 12 March 1878 without children from her second marriage.

Works
Lady Wallace long and actively pursued a career as a translator of German and Spanish works, among others:
 The Princess Ilse (by Marie Petersen), 1855
 Clara; or Slave-life in Europe (by Friedrich Wilhelm Hackländer), 1856
 Voices from the Greenwood, 1856
 The Old Monastery (by Friedrich Wilhelm Hackländer), 1857
 Frederick the Great and his Merchant (by Luise Mühlbach), 1859
 Schiller's Life and Works (by Emil Palleske), 1859
 The Castle and the Cottage in Spain (from the Spanish of Fernán Caballero), 1861
 Joseph in the Snow (by Berthold Auerbach), 1861
 Mendelssohn's Letters from Italy and Switzerland, 1862
 Will-o'-the-Wisp (by Marie Petersen), 1862
 Letters of Mendelssohn from 1833 to 1847, 1863
 Letters of Mozart, 1865
 Beethoven's Letters, 1790–1826, 1866
 Letters of Distinguished Musicians, 1867
 Reminiscences of Mendelssohn (by Elise Polko), 1868
 Alexandra Feodorowna (by August Theodor von Grimm), 1870
 A German Peasant Romance: Elsa and the Vulture (by Wilhelmine von Hillern), 1876
 Life of Mozart (by Ludwig Nohl), 1877.

Notes

References
Attribution
. Endnotes
Grove's Dict. of Music, vol. iv.; Allibone's Dict. of Engl. Lit.; Brit. Mus. Cat.; "Record of the 5th Dragoon Guards"; The Times, 7 Feb. 1867; Rogers's Book of Wallace (Grampian Club), i. 110–12; Burke's Peerage and Baronetage, 1860.

External links
 
 
 

Translators from German
Translators from Spanish
1804 births
1878 deaths
British women writers
Wives of baronets
19th-century women writers
19th-century British translators